NHL 2015 may refer to:
2014–15 NHL season
2015–16 NHL season
NHL 15, video game
2015 National Hurling League